Over 20 graduates of the United States Naval Academy (USNA) have served as members of the United States Congress as legislators in the United States Senate or United States House of Representatives or in their home nation. The Naval Academy is an undergraduate college in Annapolis, Maryland, with the mission of educating and commissioning officers for the Navy and Marine Corps. The Academy is often referred to as Annapolis, while sports media refer to the Academy as "Navy" and the students as "Midshipmen"; this usage is officially endorsed. During the latter half of the 19th century and the first decades of the 20th, the United States Naval Academy was the primary source of U.S. Navy and Marine Corps officers, with the Class of 1881 being the first to provide officers to the Marine Corps. Graduates of the Academy are also given the option of entering the United States Army or United States Air Force. Most Midshipmen are admitted through the congressional appointment system. The curriculum emphasizes various fields of engineering.

This list is drawn from graduates of the Naval Academy who became members of Congress or its equivalent in their native country. The Academy was founded in 1845 and graduated its first class in 1846. The first alumnus to graduate and go on to become a member of Congress was John Buchanan Robinson, who graduated from the Class of 1868. As of March 2009, three alumni are members of Congress: Senator John McCain (class of 1958), Senator James H. Webb, Jr. (class of 1968), and Representative Joe Sestak (class of 1974). Roilo Golez (class of 1970) served as a Congressman in his native country, the Philippines.

Over 990 noted scholars from a variety of academic fields are Academy graduates, including 45 Rhodes Scholars and 16 Marshall Scholars. Additional notable graduates include one President of the United States, two Nobel Prize recipients, 52 astronauts and 73 Medal of Honor recipients.



Legislators
"Class year" refers to the alumni's class year, which usually is the same year they graduated. However, in times of war, classes often graduate early. For example, the Class of 1943 actually graduated in 1942.

References
General references

Inline citations

United States Naval Academy, legislators
Naval Academy, legislators
Legislators